Marlboro is a metro station on the Gautrain rapid transit system in Marlboro, Gauteng. It opened on 8 June 2010 with service to OR Tambo International Airport.

Location
Marlboro is located near the southwestern corner of the interchange between the N3 Eastern Bypass and Marlboro Drive in the suburb of the same name. The surrounding area is mainly residential and includes the well-known township of Alexandra.

Transit-oriented development
One of the major aims of the Gautrain project is to reduce car dependency and its associated congestion through transit-oriented development (TOD). At Marlboro, this is accomplished by connecting the fragmented surrounding area with a pedestrian bridge across Marlboro Drive. Further, the TOD plan subdivides the Marlboro precinct into a number of areas, in particular Frankenwald and the Far East Bank.

Station layout
Marlboro station has four tracks with an island platform and side platforms. As the station is the last before the north–south line to Pretoria and the Airport Line to OR Tambo International Airport split, a cross-platform interchange is facilitated by the use of an island platform.

Gallery

References

External links
Official Sandton station site

Gautrain
Railway stations in South Africa
Railway stations opened in 2010
Buildings and structures in Johannesburg
Transport in Johannesburg
Railway stations in South Africa opened in the 21st century